Butkevičius Cabinet was the 16th cabinet of Lithuania since 1990. It consisted of the Prime Minister, who was the Head of Government, and 14 government ministers from the Social Democratic Party of Lithuania, the Labour Party, the Order and Justice, and the Electoral Action of Poles in Lithuania.

History 

After the parliamentary elections in 2012, President Dalia Grybauskaitė appointed Algirdas Butkevičius, leader of the Social Democratic Party of Lithuania, as the Prime Minister on 26 November 2012. The cabinet received its mandate on 13 December 2012. At that time, the ministers in the Butkevičius Cabinet had the highest average age of all the cabinets in the independent Lithuanian history, with the average age of its members exceeding 54 years.

It initially consisted of four parties (Social Democratic Party of Lithuania, the Labour Party, the Order and Justice, and the Electoral Action of Poles in Lithuania), but latter party left the government in August 2014.

Butkevičius cabinet became the second successive government of Lithuania to serve the full four-year term of the Seimas, returning its mandate on 14 November 2016, after the elections to the Seimas that October. Also this government was first one to retain its majority in Seimas throughout latter's full term. The government continued to serve in an acting capacity until the Skvernelis Cabinet started its work on 13 December 2016.

Cabinet

References

External links 
http://www.lrv.lt/

Cabinet of Lithuania
2012 establishments in Lithuania
Cabinets established in 2012
2016 disestablishments in Lithuania
Cabinets disestablished in 2016